Ulisse Gualtieri (born 27 March 1941) is an Italian former footballer who played as a forward.

Career 
Gualtieri played in the Serie B with Vigevano Calcio in 1958. The following season he played with Torino F.C., and assisted in securing promotion to the Serie A by winning the league. He made his debut in the Serie A on 26 March 1961 against LR Vicenza. Following a lengthy tenure with Torino he returned to the Serie B in 1963 and played with Cosenza Calcio. He later had further stints in the Serie B with various clubs as Modena F.C. 2018, U.S. Alessandria Calcio 1912, and AS Livorno. 

In 1965, he returned to play in the Serie A with former club Torino. In the summer of 1972 he played in the National Soccer League with Toronto Italia. In 1972, he played in the Serie D with A.S.D. Sarzanese Calcio 1906.

References  
 

Living people
1941 births
Association football forwards
Italian footballers
Vigevano Calcio players
Torino F.C. players
Cosenza Calcio players
Modena F.C. 2018 players
U.S. Alessandria Calcio 1912 players
U.S. Livorno 1915 players
Toronto Italia players
Serie A players
Serie B players
Serie D players
Canadian National Soccer League players
Sportspeople from the Province of Cremona
Italian expatriate footballers
Expatriate soccer players in Canada
Italian expatriate sportspeople in Canada